Sun Lianzhong (2 February 1893 – 14 August 1990) was a Chinese general during the Warlord Era, Second Sino-Japanese War and Chinese Civil War.  Best known for his command of the 2nd Group Army in the Battle of Taierzhuang, he had a long career in the army.

Biography

Sun enlisted in the army in 1912. During the Warlord Era he was a member of the Northwest Army led by Feng Yuxiang. During the Northern Expedition he fought with Zhang Zuolin's Fengtian Clique, and fought with Feng and Yan Xishan against Chiang Kai-shek in the Central Plains War. He eventually rejoined the Nanjing government, and commanded Nationalist forces during the 2nd, 3rd and 5th Campaigns against the Jiangxi Soviet.

During the Second Sino-Japanese War he commanded the  1st Army in the Northern Peiking – Hankow Railway Operation, and the 2nd Group Army in the Battle of Taiyuan and the Battle of Xuzhou.  As Deputy commander of the 6th war Area he was in command of the Chinese forces during the Battle of West Hubei, and as commander-in-chief of the 6th War Area, he defeated the Japanese at the Battle of Changde. He went on to command the 6th War Area until the end of the war.

In 1945, Sun Lianzhong was made commander-in-chief of the 11th War Area and ordered to reoccupy Tianjin, Beiping, Baoding, and Shijiazhuang and accept the surrender of the Japanese troops there. However the KMT forces soon engaged in conflict with the Chinese Communist forces and the Chinese Civil War broke out in full force again. Sun served as the commander of the  Baoding Pacification Headquarters. After two years he resigned his posts in Northern China, and retreated with the Nationalist government to Taiwan. In Taiwan, he opened a restaurant with Pang Bingxun, and served as a advisor to the government and a member of the Central Committee of the Kuomintang. Sun died in Taipei in 1990, at the age of 97.

See also
 Battle of Central Plains
 History of the Republic of China
 Second Sino-Japanese War
 Warlord Era
 Chinese Civil War

References
 Sun Lianzhong

National Revolutionary Army generals from Hebei
1893 births
1990 deaths
People from Baoding
Chinese Civil War refugees
Taiwanese people from Hebei